Thanadelthur "Thanadeltth'er" (c. 1697 – 5 February 1717) was a woman of the Chipewyan Dënesųłı̨ne nation who served as a guide and interpreter for the Hudson's Bay Company. She was instrumental in forging a peace agreement between the Dënesųłı̨ne (Chipewyan) and the Cree people. She was trilingual, able to speak English, Chipewyan, and Cree.

Life 
Thanadelthur is thought to have been born during 1697. In early 1713,  a party of Dënesųłı̨ne Chipewyans were attacked by Crees and their women were captured; among these was Thanadelthur. Women were sometimes the cause of tribal warfare, and were the prizes once the battle was over. Female slaves were valuable to the tribal workforce, and this added to the high female mortality rate among them as well. After spending the winter with their Cree captors, Thanadelthur and one other woman escaped and attempted to rejoin their people. Cold and hunger prevented them from doing so, however, and the two endured a year of hardship until Thanadelthur's travelling companion died. Five days later Thanadelthur was discovered by goose hunters from the Hudson's Bay Company. Her story was never self documented despite all of her dealings with the Hudson's Bay Company, and all of her legacy is contained to the journals from members of the HBC.

She reached the safety of York Factory, Manitoba on 24 November 1714. At this time, James Knight, a director of the Hudson's Bay Company, was seeking an 
interpreter to help convince the Cree to allow other northern Indians to reach bay side trading posts in order to trade furs with his company. The Cree now were armed with firearms that they had obtained from Europeans, objected to the attempts to invade their tribal territory, and posed a significant hindrance to the lucrative trade the company wanted to conduct. The Cree were also York Factory's main fur suppliers. There was a total of 150 persons present, with several Cree bands, Chipeywan representatives, and representatives from the Hudson's Bay Company. In 1715, Knight enlisted the aid of Thanadelthur to forge a peace agreement between the Dënesųłı̨ne (Chipewyan) and the Cree. On June 27 of that year, Thanadelthur, along with one hundred and fifty Cree and one Englishman, William Stuart, embarked on the mission to make peace between the Dënesųłı̨ne (Chipewyans) and the Cree. While James Knight was the one who enlisted her aid, it was William Stuart whom he placed Thanadelthur's care to, and sent Stuart out to meet the tribes for negotiations.

Thanadelthur was given many gifts by Knight to present to her people once the negotiations were complete. Knight gave her the name "Slave Woman Joan," after Joan of Arc. The title "slave woman" itself came from the fact that she was a Cree slave, and once escaping, Knight added "Joan" to her name for her valiant efforts in translating the agreements between the HBC and the Cree and Chipewyan.

Initially, Knight intended to provide safe passage for Thanadelthur and the Dënesųłı̨ne (Chipewyans) so that they could return to their home country in 1716. A harsh winter and an enduring fear of bands of Cree who had not been parties to the peace agreement prevented this, however, and caused him to allow the Dënesųłı̨ne (Chipewyans) to spend the winter at the company factory.

A promised trading post in the Dënesųłı̨ne (Chipewyan) lands had not been built, and Thanadelthur's next mission from Knight was to return to her home country and assure her people that the post eventually would be built. Before that could be accomplished, however, she died of a fever on February 5, 1717. Thanadelthur received a ceremonial burial from Knight, and he stated that although the weather was nice that day, it was the "most Meloncholys't by the Loss of her." He also stated that he had difficulty finding another native translator for the time, and ended up spending "above 60 skins value in goods" to replace Thanadelthur.

Legacy 
The Dënesųłı̨ne (Chipewyans) are a national group that is a member of a much larger ethnographic na-dene group whose culture is identified as the Dene, by anthropologists. The legacy of Thanadelthur has survived in the oral traditions of the Dene people and in the records of the Hudson's Bay Company. This later recognition and inclusion in historical records created by the trading company is a rare occurrence for a native person, even if she remained unnamed in documents: when her travels were recorded, she was identified repeatedly as the 'Slave Woman'. Her name has survived to be included in modern histories by means of records retained by the native tribes. In comparison, her story is of legends in the Denesųłı̨ne language. Reference to this says, she was our grandmother who brought the Cree and Dënesųłı̨ne together in peace. Publications of other oral histories gave way to the name that she is known by today. The name "Tha-narelther" was first published in an oral history in 1883 by a Catholic missionary to the Dene, named Father Emile Petitot. The name Tha-narelther meant "falling sable." Petitot had heard the story from a man with Cree and Dene ancestry, named Alexis Enna-aze, who told him this story of a Chipewyan woman who convinced her people to trade with the Hudson's Bay Company. Edward S. Curtis in 1920 published his own version of the story he had learned from Dene people in Cold Lake, Alberta. It was similar to Petitot's, but Curtis called her Thanadelthur, which meant "marten shake," and has become the name she is recognized by today. Explorer Samuel Hearne, who recorded Chipewyan society in the later 18th century, recorded that girls were named after a property of marten.

The lasting peace agreement honed by Thanadelthur paved the way for expansion of the Hudson's Bay Company farther north and led to further integration of the arriving Europeans into the tribes of the native Indians.

In 2000, the Historic Sites and Monuments Board of Canada recognized Thanadelthur as a national historic person of Canada.

In popular media

Thanadelthur is portrayed as a leading character in the James Archibald Houston's novel Running West, along with William Stewart and James Knight. The novel traces her life from the time she is captured and enslaved by Cree Indians, through the journey from York Factory to the land of the Dene, and their return.

Canadian musician Mike Ford recorded the song "Thanadelthur" on his second album Canada Needs You.

References 

1697 births
1717 deaths

Year of birth uncertain
18th-century indigenous people of the Americas
Dene people
Interpreters
Persons of National Historic Significance (Canada)
18th-century translators
Canadian slaves
18th-century slaves